Bob Randall (born Stanley Goldstein; August 20, 1937February 11, 1995) was an American screenwriter, playwright, novelist, and television producer.

Biography
Randall was born Stanley Goldstein on August 20, 1937 in the Bronx borough of New York City. Prior to becoming a writer, Randall worked as an advertising copywriter.

In 1977, Randall had his only screen acting role as J. M. Bedford in the short-lived television comedy series On Our Own, which he also created. The same year, Randall published the thriller novel The Fan, about an aging actress stalked by a psychotic young man. The novel won an Edgar Award for Best First Novel, and was adapted into the 1981 feature film of the same name starring Lauren Bacall and Michael Biehn.

In 1984, Randall began producing the network series Kate & Allie, and also served as a writer of 34 episodes. Randall later wrote the screenplay for the television film David's Mother (1994), which earned him one Primetime Emmy Award for Outstanding Writing for a Miniseries and a further three nominations in the same category.

Death
Randall died in New Milford, Connecticut on February 11, 1995, aged 57, of AIDS-related illness. He was survived by Gary Pratt, his partner of 15 years.

Bibliography

Novels
The Fan (1977)
The Next (1981)
The Calling (1983)
The Last Man on the List (1990)

Plays
6 Rms Riv Vu (1972)
The Magic Show (1974)

Filmography

Accolades

References

External links

1937 births
1995 deaths
American dramatists and playwrights
American screenwriters
American television writers
American thriller writers
AIDS-related deaths in Connecticut
Edgar Award winners
American gay writers
LGBT people from New York (state)
Male actors from New York City
Primetime Emmy Award winners
Writers from the Bronx
20th-century American male actors
20th-century American male writers
20th-century American screenwriters
20th-century American LGBT people